The Shields parameter, also called the Shields criterion or Shields number, is a nondimensional number used to calculate the initiation of motion of sediment in a fluid flow. This parameter has been developed by Albert F. Shields, and is called later Shields parameter. The Shields parameter is the main parameter of the Shields formula. It is given by:

where:
  is a dimensional shear stress;
  is the density of the sediment;
  is the density of the fluid;
  is acceleration due to gravity;
 is a characteristic particle diameter of the sediment.

Physical meaning

By multiplying the top and bottom of the Shields parameter by D2, you can see that it is proportional to the ratio of fluid force on the particle to the weight of the particle.

References

External links
 

Sedimentology
Dimensionless numbers
Fluid dynamics